An odds ratio (OR) is a statistic that quantifies the strength of the association between two events, A and B. The odds ratio is defined as the ratio of the odds of A in the presence of B and the odds of A in the absence of B, or equivalently (due to symmetry), the ratio of the odds of B in the presence of A and the odds of B in the absence of A. Two events are independent if and only if the OR equals 1, i.e., the odds of one event are the same in either the presence or absence of the other event. If the OR is greater than 1, then A and B are associated (correlated) in the sense that, compared to the absence of B, the presence of B raises the odds of A, and symmetrically the presence of A raises the odds of B. Conversely, if the OR is less than 1, then A and B are negatively correlated, and the presence of one event reduces the odds of the other event.

Note that the odds ratio is symmetric in the two events, and there is no causal direction implied (correlation does not imply causation): an OR greater than 1 does not establish that B causes A, or that A causes B.

Two similar statistics that are often used to quantify associations are the relative risk (RR) and the absolute risk reduction (ARR). Often, the parameter of greatest interest is actually the RR, which is the ratio of the probabilities analogous to the odds used in the OR. However, available data frequently do not allow for the computation of the RR or the ARR but do allow for the computation of the OR, as in case-control studies, as explained below. On the other hand, if one of the properties (A or B) is sufficiently rare (in epidemiology this is called the rare disease assumption), then the OR is approximately equal to the corresponding RR.

The OR plays an important role in the logistic model.

Definition and basic properties

A motivating example, in the context of the rare disease assumption

Suppose a radiation leak in a village of 1,000 people increased the incidence of a rare disease.  The total number of people exposed to the radiation was   out of which  developed the disease and  stayed healthy. The total number of people not exposed was   out of which  developed the disease and  stayed healthy. We can organize this in a table:

One obvious way to compare the risks is to use the ratio of the two, the relative risk.

The odds ratio is different.

As illustrated by this example, in a rare-disease case like this, the relative risk and the odds ratio are almost the same.

Relative risk is easier to understand than the odds ratio, but one reason to use odds ratio is that usually, data on the entire population is not available and random sampling must be used. One could take a random sample of fifty villagers, but quite possibly such a random sample would not include anybody with the disease, since only 2.6% of the population are diseased. Instead, one might use a case-control study in which all 26 diseased villagers are interviewed as well as a random sample of 26 who do not have the disease. The results might turn out as follows ("might", because this is a random sample):

The odds in this sample of getting the disease given that someone is exposed is 20/10 and the odds given that someone is not exposed is 6/16. The odds ratio is thus . Because the study selected for people with the disease, half the people in the sample have the disease and it is known that that is more than the population-wide prevalence.

It is standard in the medical literature to calculate the odds ratio and then use the rare-disease assumption (which is usually reasonable) to claim that the relative risk is approximately equal to it. This not only allows for the use of case-control studies, but makes controlling for confounding variables such as weight or age using regression analysis easier and has the desirable properties discussed in other sections of this article of invariance and insensitivity to the type of sampling.

Definition in terms of group-wise odds

The odds ratio is the ratio of the odds of an event occurring in one group to the odds of it occurring in another group.  The term is also used to refer to sample-based estimates of this ratio.  These groups might be men and women, an experimental group and a control group, or any other dichotomous classification.  If the probabilities of the event in each of the groups are p1 (first group) and p2 (second group), then the odds ratio is:

where qx = 1 − px. An odds ratio of 1 indicates that the condition or event under study is equally likely to occur in both groups.  An odds ratio greater than 1 indicates that the condition or event is more likely to occur in the first group. And an odds ratio less than 1 indicates that the condition or event is less likely to occur in the first group. The odds ratio must be nonnegative if it is defined.  It is undefined if p2q1 equals zero, i.e., if p2 equals zero or q1 equals zero.

Definition in terms of joint and conditional probabilities

The odds ratio can also be defined in terms of the joint probability distribution of two binary random variables.  The joint distribution of binary random variables  and  can be written

where 11, 10, 01 and 00 are non-negative "cell probabilities" that sum to one.  The odds for  within the two subpopulations defined by  = 1 and  = 0 are defined in terms of the conditional probabilities given , i.e., :

Thus the odds ratio is

The simple expression on the right, above, is easy to remember as the product of the probabilities of the "concordant cells"  divided by the product of the probabilities of the "discordant cells" .  However note that in some applications the labeling of categories as zero and one is arbitrary, so there is nothing special about concordant versus discordant values in these applications.

Symmetry

If we had calculated the odds ratio based on the conditional probabilities given Y,

we would have obtained the same result

Other measures of effect size for binary data such as the relative risk do not have this symmetry property.

Relation to statistical independence

In this case, the odds ratio equals one, and conversely the odds ratio can only equal one if the joint probabilities can be factored in this way.  Thus the odds ratio equals one if and only if X and Y are independent.

Recovering the cell probabilities from the odds ratio and marginal probabilities

If the odds ratio R differs from 1, then

where , and

In the case where , we have independence, so .

Once we have , the other three cell probabilities can easily be recovered from the marginal probabilities.

Example

Suppose that in a sample of 100 men, 90 drank wine in the previous week (so 10 did not), while in a sample of 80 women only 20 drank wine in the same period (so 60 did not). This forms the contingency table:

The odds ratio (OR) can be directly calculated from this table as:

Alternatively, the odds of a man drinking wine are 90 to 10, or 9:1, while the odds of a woman drinking wine are only 20 to 60, or 1:3 = 0.33. The odds ratio is thus 9/0.33, or 27, showing that men are much more likely to drink wine than women. The detailed calculation is:

This example also shows how odds ratios are sometimes sensitive in stating relative positions: in this sample men are (90/100)/(20/80) = 3.6 times as likely to have drunk wine than women, but have 27 times the odds. The logarithm of the odds ratio, the difference of the logits of the probabilities, tempers this effect, and also makes the measure symmetric with respect to the ordering of groups. For example, using natural logarithms, an odds ratio of 27/1 maps to 3.296, and an odds ratio of 1/27 maps to −3.296.

Statistical inference
Several approaches to statistical inference for odds ratios have been developed.

One approach to inference uses large sample approximations to the sampling distribution of the log odds ratio (the natural logarithm of the odds ratio).  If we use the joint probability notation defined above, the population log odds ratio is

If we observe data in the form of a contingency table

then the probabilities in the joint distribution can be estimated as

where , with  being the sum of all four cell counts.  The sample log odds ratio is

.

The distribution of the log odds ratio is approximately normal with:

 

The standard error for the log odds ratio is approximately

.

This is an asymptotic approximation, and will not give a meaningful result if any of the cell counts are very small.

An alternative approach to inference for odds ratios looks at the distribution of the data conditionally on the marginal frequencies of X and Y.  An advantage of this approach is that the sampling distribution of the odds ratio can be expressed exactly.

Role in logistic regression

Logistic regression is one way to generalize the odds ratio beyond two binary variables.  Suppose we have a binary response variable Y and a binary predictor variable X, and in addition we have other predictor variables Z1, ..., Zp that may or may not be binary.  If we use multiple logistic regression to regress Y on X, Z1, ..., Zp, then the estimated coefficient  for X is related to a conditional odds ratio.  Specifically, at the population level

so  is an estimate of this conditional odds ratio.

Insensitivity to the type of sampling

If the data form a "population sample", then the cell probabilities  are interpreted as the frequencies of each of the four groups in the population as defined by their X and Y values. In many settings it is impractical to obtain a population sample, so a selected sample is used. In this situation, our data would follow the following joint probabilities:

The odds ratio  for this distribution does not depend on the value of f.  This shows that the odds ratio (and consequently the log odds ratio) is invariant to non-random sampling based on one of the variables being studied.  Note however that the standard error of the log odds ratio does depend on the value of f.

This fact is exploited in two important situations:

 Suppose the marginal distribution of one variable, say X, is very skewed.  For example, if we are studying the relationship between high alcohol consumption and pancreatic cancer in the general population, the incidence of pancreatic cancer would be very low, so it would require a very large population sample to get a modest number of pancreatic cancer cases.  However we could use data from hospitals to contact most or all of their pancreatic cancer patients, and then randomly sample an equal number of subjects without pancreatic cancer (this is called a "case-control study").

In both these settings, the odds ratio can be calculated from the selected sample, without biasing the results relative to what would have been obtained for a population sample.

Use in quantitative research

Due to the widespread use of logistic regression, the odds ratio is widely used in many fields of medical and social science research.  The odds ratio is commonly used in survey research, in epidemiology, and to express the results of some clinical trials, such as in case-control studies. It is often abbreviated "OR" in reports. When data from multiple surveys is combined, it will often be expressed as "pooled OR".

Relation to relative risk

As explained in the "Motivating Example" section, the relative risk is usually better than the odds ratio for understanding the relation between risk and some variable such as radiation or a new drug. That section also explains that if the rare disease assumption holds, the odds ratio is a good approximation to relative risk and that it has some advantages over relative risk. When the rare disease assumption does not hold, the unadjusted odds ratio can overestimate the relative risk, but novel methods can easily use the same data to estimate the relative risk, risk differences, base probabilities, or other quantities.

If the absolute risk in the unexposed group is available, conversion between the two is calculated by:

 

where RC is the absolute risk of the unexposed group.

If the rare disease assumption does not apply, the odds ratio may be very different from the relative risk and can be misleading.

Consider the death rate of men and women passengers when the Titanic sank. Of 462 women, 154 died and 308 survived. Of 851 men, 709 died and 142 survived. Clearly a man on the Titanic was more likely to die than a woman, but how much more likely?  Since over half the passengers died, the rare disease assumption is strongly violated.

To compute the odds ratio, note that for women the odds of dying were 1 to 2 (154/308). For men, the odds were 5 to 1 (709/142). The odds ratio is 9.99 (4.99/.5). Men had ten times the odds of dying as women.

For women, the probability of death was 33% (154/462). For men the probability was 83% (709/851). The relative risk of death is 2.5 (.83/.33). A man had 2.5 times a woman's probability of dying.

Which number correctly represents how much more dangerous it was to be a man on the Titanic? Relative risk has the advantage of being easier to understand and of better representing how people think.

Confusion and exaggeration
Odds ratios have often been confused with relative risk in medical literature. For non-statisticians, the odds ratio is a difficult concept to comprehend, and it gives a more impressive figure for the effect. However, most authors consider that the relative risk is readily understood. In one study, members of a national disease foundation were actually 3.5 times more likely than nonmembers to have heard of a common treatment for that disease – but the odds ratio was 24 and the paper stated that members were ‘more than 20-fold more likely to have heard of’ the treatment. A study of papers published in two journals reported that 26% of the articles that used an odds ratio interpreted it as a risk ratio.

This may reflect the simple process of uncomprehending authors choosing the most impressive-looking and publishable figure. But its use may in some cases be deliberately deceptive. It has been suggested that the odds ratio should only be presented as a measure of effect size when the risk ratio cannot be estimated directly, but with newly available methods it is always possible to estimate the risk ratio, which should generally be used instead.

Invertibility and invariance

The odds ratio has another unique property of being directly mathematically invertible whether analyzing the OR as either disease survival or disease onset incidence – where the OR for survival is direct reciprocal of 1/OR for risk. This is known as the 'invariance of the odds ratio'. In contrast, the relative risk does not possess this mathematical invertible property when studying disease survival vs. onset incidence. This phenomenon of OR invertibility vs. RR non-invertibility is best illustrated with an example:

Suppose in a clinical trial, one has an adverse event risk of 4/100 in drug group, and 2/100 in placebo... yielding a RR=2 and OR=2.04166 for drug-vs-placebo adverse risk. However, if analysis was inverted and adverse events were instead analyzed as event-free survival, then the drug group would have a rate of 96/100, and placebo group would have a rate of 98/100—yielding a drug-vs-placebo a RR=0.9796 for survival, but an OR=0.48979. As one can see, a RR of 0.9796 is clearly not the reciprocal of a RR of 2. In contrast, an OR of 0.48979 is indeed the direct reciprocal of an OR of 2.04166.

This is again what is called the 'invariance of the odds ratio', and why a RR for survival is not the same as a RR for risk, while the OR has this symmetrical property when analyzing either survival or adverse risk. The danger to clinical interpretation for the OR comes when the adverse event rate is not rare, thereby exaggerating differences when the OR rare-disease assumption is not met. On the other hand, when the disease is rare, using a RR for survival (e.g. the RR=0.9796 from above example) can clinically hide and conceal an important doubling of adverse risk associated with a drug or exposure.

Estimators of the odds ratio

Sample odds ratio
The sample odds ratio n11n00 / n10n01 is easy to calculate, and for moderate and large samples performs well as an estimator of the population odds ratio. When one or more of the cells in the contingency table can have a small value, the sample odds ratio can be biased and exhibit high variance.

Alternative estimators
A number of alternative estimators of the odds ratio have been proposed to address limitations of the sample odds ratio.  One alternative estimator is the conditional maximum likelihood estimator, which conditions on the row and column margins when forming the likelihood to maximize (as in Fisher's exact test).  Another alternative estimator is the Mantel–Haenszel estimator.

Numerical examples

The following four contingency tables contain observed cell counts, along with the corresponding sample odds ratio (OR) and sample log odds ratio (LOR):

The following joint probability distributions contain the population cell probabilities, along with the corresponding population odds ratio (OR) and population log odds ratio (LOR):

Numerical example

Related statistics 

There are various other summary statistics for contingency tables that measure association between two events, such as Yule's Y, Yule's Q; these two are normalized so they are 0 for independent events, 1 for perfectly correlated, −1 for perfectly negatively correlated.  studied these and argued that these measures of association must be functions of the odds ratio, which he referred to as the cross-ratio.

See also 
 Cohen's h
 Cross-ratio
 Diagnostic odds ratio
 Forest plot
 Hazard ratio
 Likelihood ratio
 Rate ratio

References

Citations

Sources

External links 
 Odds Ratio Calculator – website
 Odds Ratio Calculator with various tests – website
 OpenEpi, a web-based program that calculates the odds ratio, both unmatched and pair-matched

Epidemiology
Medical statistics
Bayesian statistics
Summary statistics for contingency tables